Hi, How Are You: The Unfinished Album is the sixth self-released music cassette album by singer-songwriter Daniel Johnston, recorded in September 1983.  The subtitle refers to the length of the album; Johnston had intended for it to be an hour long release, as a majority of his earlier releases were.

Background

Recording 
On September 1, 1983, Daniel Johnston was evicted from his brother Dick's home in Houston, Texas. Daniel had been living with Dick throughout the summer and recorded his previous album Yip/Jump Music in the garage. Following his eviction, Margie Johnston, his sister, let Daniel live with her in her San Marcos home, where he worked in pizza delivery. Margie didn't have any extra furniture for Daniel, so they bought a mattress which was placed on a floor for him to sleep on. Margie notes that Daniel thrived in this environment because he was allowed to make a mess.

The backing music to the song 'Desperate Man Blues' comes from a song by Johnny Dankworth titled 'Desperate Dan' from the album 'England's Ambassador of Jazz', which Johnston owned. The track resonated heavily with Johnston, leading to its inclusion on the album.

The album is one of the most sonically varied of Johnston's early output.  While earlier records found him focusing on piano or chord organ songs almost exclusively, this album blends both approaches along with experiments in tape and noise collage, and some tentative playing on a stringed instrument, referred to as a guitar, a toy guitar, or a ukulele.

Artwork / Title 
The album's artwork is a sketch of 'Jeremiah The Frog of Innosense' (sic), a character created by Johnston inspired by an old rubber stamp box he discovered while working at AstroWorld that previous summer. The box featured a picture of a frog along with the text 'Hi, How Are You?' Johnston became inspired by the phrase and remembered that he had previously used it in his song 'Grievances,' from Songs of Pain.And I saw you at the funeral, you were standing there like a temple 

I said, "Hi, how are you? Hello"

And I pulled up a casket and crawled in Since he had already called back to Grievances countless times throughout his previous tapes, he felt it was only appropriate to continue to use the phrase as yet another call-back. 'Jeremiah', the frog's name, was taken from the song "Joy to the World" by Three Dog Night, which opens with the lyric, 'Jeremiah was a bullfrog.'

Promotion 
Daniel would promote the album through handing out copies to people he met. One individual given a copy of the album was Kathy McCarty, who said that 'That weird kid is probably the only genius I've met in my life!"

This was the first Daniel Johnston album to be given a widely distributed release as a vinyl LP; it was released on Homestead Records in 1988.

Legacy 

In 1988, when the album was pressed on LP by Homestead Records, Mark Lerario for the Reading Eagle said that it sounded like 'A basement tape haphazardly put together by deaf hippies.'

The song "Big Business Monkey" appeared in the soundtrack to the 1990 film, Slacker.

By 1992 Kurt Cobain began wearing a t-shirt of the album's cover, launching Johnston into mainstream popularity. Two years later, in 1994, Kathy McCarty released her Johnston tribute album, which featured five tracks from Hi How Are You.

In 2006, Ty Burr Globe for the Record-Journal described "Walking the Cow" as "Demented and heartbreakingly fragile".

In 2009, the song "Desperate Man Blues" was included in the play Punk Rock (play).

A 2015 documentary about Johnston, titled Hi, How Are You Daniel Johnston? was named after the record.

In 2018, the Mayor of Austin, Texas, declared January 22 (Johnston's birthday) to be "Hi, How Are You Day", a day dedicated to mental health awareness funded by the non-profit organisation of the same name. 

In 2019, American post-disco duo De Lux released a cover of 'Get Yourself Together.'

On April 9, 2021, The Johnston estate announced an NFT based on the album's cover.

Track listing

Release History

References 

Daniel Johnston albums
1983 albums
Unfinished albums
Self-released albums